Telmatochromis dhonti is a species of cichlid endemic to Lake Tanganyika where it prefers rocky substrates.  This species can reach a length of  TL.  It can also be found in the aquarium trade. The specific name honours the collector of the type G. Dhont-De Bie of the Belgian East African Expeditionary Force.

References

External links 
 Photograph

dhonti
Taxa named by George Albert Boulenger
Fish described in 1919
Taxonomy articles created by Polbot